Muir is a masculine given name. Notable people with the name include:

 Muir S. Fairchild (1894–1950), Vice Chief of Staff of the United States Air Force
 Muir Gray, British doctor and government official
 Muir Mathieson (1911–1975), British conductor and composer
 Muir Russell (born 1949), Scottish civil servant, Principal and Vice-Chancellor of the University of Glasgow

Masculine given names